Stefano Utoikamanu (born 15 May 2000) is a professional rugby league footballer who plays as a  for the  Wests Tigers in the NRL.

Background
Utoikamanu played his junior rugby league for the Cabramatta Two Blues. Utoikamanu played for Parramatta's under 20's team in 2018 and 2019, moving into ISP competition for Wentworthville. Utoikamanu also represented NSW under 18's and 20's teams in back to back years.

Playing career

2020
On 29 January 2020, Utoikamanu signed a three-year deal with the Wests Tigers from 2021 worth $800,000 which was significantly higher than Parramatta's offer of $70,000 a season.

Utoikamanu made his first grade debut in round 9 of the 2020 NRL season for Parramatta against the Newcastle Knights.  He came off the bench in the final ten seconds of the game and made one hit-up as Parramatta won the match 10-4.  Following the game, Utoikamanu was spotted hugging and interacting with fans which was strictly against player protocols during the Covid-19 pandemic.

2021
He made his club debut for the Wests Tigers in round 1 of the 2021 NRL season against Canberra which ended in a 12-30 defeat.  He scored his first try in the NRL during round 3 of the competition as the club defeated Newcastle 24-20.  On 5 July, he was called into the New South Wales squad for game 3 of the 2021 State of Origin series.  He was named on the extended bench but did not feature in the match.

He played a total of 22 games for the Wests Tigers in the 2021 NRL season as the club finished 13th and missed the finals.

2022
On 31 January, he extended his existing contract that was until the end of 2023, for a further two seasons, keeping him at the club until the end of the 2025 season. On 29 March, it was announced that Utoikamanu would miss six to eight matches with an ankle injury which occurred during the clubs loss to the New Zealand Warriors.
In round 9, he made his return to the side against Manly but was sent to the sin bin for a professional foul during the clubs 36-22 loss at Brookvale Oval.
Utoikamanu played a total of nine games for the Wests Tigers club in the 2022 NRL season as they finished bottom of the table and claimed the Wooden Spoon for the first time.

References

External links
Parramatta Eels profile

2000 births
Living people
New Zealand rugby league players
New Zealand sportspeople of Tongan descent
Rugby league players from Auckland
Rugby league props
Parramatta Eels players
Wests Tigers players
Wentworthville Magpies players